, often shortened to , is the term used to refer to netizens who espouse ultranationalist far-right views on Japanese social media, as well as in English to those who are proficient. Netto-uyoku is evaluated as having similarities to Western right-wing populism or alt-right in many ways.

The netto-uyoku are individuals with xenophobic and racist viewpoints who gather on specific online forums, where their viewpoints are emboldened via interacting with other people who share the same perspective. They exhibit xenophobia towards immigrants; depict other countries negatively, most notably China and Korea; support Japanese revisionism; as well as glorify and justify Japan's wartime actions. They are known for posting information on internet platforms that try to incite and encourage Japanese revisionism and xenophobic neo-nationalism. Many also exhibit praises of Japan during the historical eras such as the Muromachi and Tokugawa period, showing some anti-American and anti-Western tendencies who are seen with contempt as  attenuating Japanese traditional culture under Westernization.

Netto-uyoku have been described as a "new breed of neo-nationalists who interact almost entirely within their own cyber community, shut off from the rest of society" by Japanese critic and writer Furuya Tsunehira. Furuya further expounds "the average age of Japan's Internet right-wingers is around 40. Some 75% of them are male". Furuya further observes that although active on the web, they lack institutional political representation offline, leading to a sense of frustration and a tendency to be more active online and to back the far-right elements of the ruling Liberal Democratic Party of Japan, especially those under the administration of former Prime Minister Shinzo Abe.

Origins
Japan's "cyber nationalist phenomenon" can be traced back to 2002, the year Japan and South Korea jointly held the FIFA World Cup. Frustrations with the perceived unfair play of the South Korean team were ignored by mainstream Japanese media which largely kept an upbeat tone. This resulted in online bulletin boards and forums becoming popular outlets for these grievances. With the media avoiding coverage critical of the event or of the Koreans, the Internet was viewed as the sole medium free from the constraints of official policy or political correctness. This episode helped fuel the distrust of the mainstream media's coverage of South Korea and helped set the anti-Korean, anti–mainstream media tone that was to become a defining feature of Japan's Internet right-wing community.

Another event that further emboldened the netto-uyoku occurred in September 2002 when North Korea officially admitted to kidnapping Japanese citizens, a fact which it had long denied.

Views
Netto-uyoku generally express support for historically revisionist views that portray the former Empire of Japan in a positive light, juxtaposed with negative portrayals of North and South Korea, as well as China (anti-Chinese sentiment). Netto-uyoku support visits by politicians to Yasukuni Shrine, where 1,068 convicted war criminals (including 14 Class-A war criminals) are enshrined. Visits to the shrine are often met with censure by China and South Korea due to a perception of a lack of remorse for and even endorsement of Imperial Japan's wartime atrocities.

Netto-uyoku also express criticism against domestic left-wing and centre-left parties, such as the Japanese Communist Party, Constitutional Democratic Party of Japan, the former Democratic Party of Japan, and the Japanese mainstream media, which they accuse of having a liberal bias. Netto-uyoku also tend to express hostility towards immigrants, especially those from countries that have diplomatic tensions with Japan.

Rise of Trumpism
The rise of Trumpism among the netto-uyoku community has been observed since September 2020, two months prior to the 2020 United States presidential election. Some Japanese political commentators even theorized that Shinzo Abe's resignation as Prime Minister in September 2020 to be a juncture for netto-uyoku to shift their central figure to Donald Trump as a "political upgrade" in promoting diplomatic policies which embody anti-Chinese sentiment. As such they began spreading Trump's conspiracy theories in an attempt to overturn the 2020 American presidential election.

See also

 2channel
 Ethnic issues in Japan
 Japanese nationalism
 Manga Kenkanryu
 Neo Gōmanism Manifesto Special – On War
 Mass media in Japan
 Neo-nationalism
 Neo-nazism
 Neo-fascism
 Reactionary
 Tokutei Asia
 Trumpism
 Uyoku dantai 
 Zaitokukai

Notes

References

External links

The Significance of Japanese Right-Wing Net Citizens: "Netouyo" by the Seisen International School

Alt-right in Asia
Internet trolls
Japanese nationalism
Racism in Japan
Right-wing populism in Japan
Far-right politics in Japan
Trumpism
Anti-Korean sentiment in Japan
Anti-Chinese sentiment in Japan